Ingleside Plantation was a forced-labor farm of  located in extreme northeast Leon County, Florida and established by Joel C. Blake. In 1860, Blake was enslaving 116 people to work his land, which was mostly devoted to producing cotton as a cash crop.

Blake, who was 29 years old in 1860, married Laura Parish, some relation to his mother. He founded Ingleside Plantation by purchasing land to the east of Blakely Plantation. Blake later joined the Confederate States Army and was killed on July 2, 1863, at the Battle of Gettysburg.

Ingleside would later become Ring Oak Plantation, a private hunting plantation co-owned by David Sinton Ingalls and Robert Livingston Ireland, Jr.

Location
Ingleside was bounded on the east by the shores of Lake Miccosukee and would have been bound on the west by Blake's mother's Blakely Plantation. Today, the land is County Road 59 (Veterans Memorial Drive). Ingleside's northern boundary would now be Cypress Landing Road and to the south it would have bounded by the streets of Leland Circle and Indigo Lane.

Plantation statistics
The Leon County Florida 1860 Agricultural Census shows that the Blakely Plantation had the following:
Improved Land: 
Unimproved Land: 
Cash value of plantation: $25,000
Cash value of farm implements/machinery: $1200
Cash value of farm animals: $5,000
Number of enslaved: 116
Bushels of corn: 7000
Bales of cotton: 181

External links

 Letter from Joel Blake to his wife Laura

References
Rootsweb Plantations
Largest Slaveholders from 1860 Slave Census Sschedules
Florida Historical Markers Program
Paisley, Clifton; From Cotton To Quail, University of Florida Press, c1968.

Plantations in Leon County, Florida
Cotton plantations in Florida